Mount Elgon National Park is a national park  northeast of Lake Victoria. The Kenyan part of the park was gazetted in 1968, the Ugandan part in 1992.

Mount Elgon

The park is named after Mount Elgon, an extinct shield volcano on the border of Uganda and Kenya.

Location
Mount Elgon National Park is uniquely split down the middle by the Kenyan-Ugandan border. Mount Elgon is an important water catchment for the Nzoia River, which flows to Lake Victoria, and for the Turkwel River (known as the Suam River in Uganda), which flows into Lake Turkana.

Climate
The climate is moist to moderate dry. The dry seasons run from June to August and from December to March, although it can rain at any time.

Vegetation

Elgon's slopes support a rich variety of vegetation ranging from montane forest to high open moorland studded with the giant lobelia, groundsel and heather plants The vegetation varies with altitude. The mountain slopes are covered with Elgon olive (Olea capensis subsp. macrocarpa) and Pouteria adolfi-friedericii wet montane forest. At higher altitudes, this changes to olive and Afrocarpus gracilior forest, and then an Afrocarpus and bamboo Arundinaria alpina zone. Higher still is a Hagenia abyssinica zone and then moorland with heaths Erica arborea and Erica trimera, tussock grasses such as Agrostis gracilifolia and Festuca pilgeri, herbs such as Alchemilla, Helichrysum, Lobelia, and the giant groundsels Senecio barbatipes and Senecio elgonensis.

The botanical diversity of the park includes giant Afrocarpus, Elgon olive (Olea capensis subsp. macrocarpa), African juniper (Juniperus procera), pillarwood (Cassipourea malosana), elderberry (Sambucus adnata), pure stands of Afrocarpus gracilior and many orchids.

Of the 400 species recorded for the area the following are of particular note as they only occur in high altitude broadleaf montane forest: Ardisiandra wettsteinii, Carduus afromontanus, Echinops hoehnelii, Ranunculus keniensis (previously thought to be endemic to Mount Kenya), and Romulea keniensis.

Wildlife

Mammals
Elephants and buffalo can be found on the lower slopes. The park is also home to a variety of small antelope and duiker, as well forest monkeys, including the black-and-white colobus and blue monkey. red-tailed monkey have been reported after being thought to be locally extinct. Both leopard and hyena exist there.

Birds
Mount Elgon is home to at least 144 bird species. Of particular interest are Jackson's spurfowl, the eastern bronze-naped pigeon, Hartlaub's turaco, the Tacazze sunbird and the endangered lammergeier, due to their restricted range.

Invertebrates
Maathai's longleg, an endangered dragonfly was discovered here in 2005 and named after Nobel Prize winner Wangari Maathai.

Half of Uganda's butterfly species have been reported in Mt. Elgon.

Conservation management
Prior to colonial administration, the land around Mount Elgon was managed based on indigenous power structures and rules, which forbade certain excessive utilization of natural resources on the communally owned upper elevations of the mountain. Demand for these resources was met sustainably because the human population density in the surrounding area was many times smaller than it is today.

Uganda
The Uganda Protectorate administration gazetted its side of Mount Elgon a Forest Reserve, managed by the Forestry Department, in 1929. In 1937, the boundary survey was completed but parcels were repeatedly degazetted to provide land for local residents. In 1940, the area became the Mount Elgon Crown Forest and in 1951 a Central Forest Reserve.

An additional  were settled illegally. The area legally remained a part of the reserve until 2002 when it was officially degazetted. Management of the park disintegrated during the civil wars. In January 1994, the reserve was finally converted into a national park, although timber harvesting continued in some areas.

Attractions
Together with the fauna and flora, the park has a variety of scenery; this includes cliffs, caves, waterfalls, gorges, mesas, calderas, hot springs, and the mountain peaks. The most popular areas are the four explorable, vast caves where frequent night visitors such as elephants and buffaloes come to lick the natural salt found on the cave walls. Kitum cave, with overhanging crystalline walls, enters 200 m into the side of Mt. Elgon.

At the Endebess Bluff there a panoramic view of the areas' escarpments, gorges, mesas, and rivers. The highest peak of Mt. Elgon on the Kenya side, Koitoboss, measures , and is easily reached by hikers in about two hours from the road's end.
Activities include

 Vehicle circuits leading to animal viewing areas, the caves and Koitoboss peak.
 Self-guided walking trails
 Hiking to Endebess Bluff and Koitoboss Peak
 Primate and bird watching
 Cave explorations
 Camping photography

Mount Elgon Caves
Recent studies have shown that elephants and other mammals are major contributors to the development of these unique natural phenomena. The animals frequently visit at night to 'mine' the natural salt by licking it from the cave walls. The caves are mapped and Kitum, Chepnyali, and Mackingeny can be explored by visitors to the park

Cheworei family caves in Chesokwo area which includes Chebui caves, Kebenob-Teretit caves and the Kochonget.

Other attractions
Other attractions include ancient cave paintings near the trailhead at Budadiri, and hot springs in the former volcano's crater which bubble at temperatures of up to 48 °C.

Jackson's Pool and Jackson's Peak 

 Jackson's Pool stands at 4,050m and is a natural pool with shallow waters. This pool lies in the shadow of the 4,165m high Jackson's Peak, a free-standing volcanic plug rising from the western flank of the mountain. These features were named after the explorer Frederick Jackson, who in 1889 was the first European to climb Mount Elgon.

Popular culture
The park is the setting for parts of Richard Preston's book The Hot Zone. Kitum Cave is also a setting in the book.
Henry Rider Haggard's well-known novel 'King Solomon's Mines' may have been inspired by the Mt Elgon Caves.

References

External links

 Uganda Wildlife Authority – Mount Elgon National Park
 Kenya Wildlife Service – Mount Elgon National Park
 Mt. Elgon Caves, including a Visitors' Guide
 Mount Elgon National Park Guide

Mount Elgon
National parks of Kenya
National parks of Uganda
Trans-Nzoia County
Biosphere reserves of Kenya
Protected areas established in 1968
Protected areas established in 1992
Important Bird Areas of Uganda
Bungoma County
East African montane forests